Gillian S Treers (born 8 February 1952) is a British former swimmer.

Swimming career
She competed in two events at the 1968 Summer Olympics.

She represented England in the butterfly events, at the 1970 British Commonwealth Games in Edinburgh, Scotland.

References

1952 births
Living people
British female swimmers
Olympic swimmers of Great Britain
Swimmers at the 1968 Summer Olympics
Sportspeople from London
Swimmers at the 1970 British Commonwealth Games
Commonwealth Games competitors for England
20th-century British women